Argun, also known as Ustrada (Ustrada-Ġala or Орга-ГӀала, Orga-Ġala) is a town in the Chechen Republic, Russia, located on the Argun River. Population:    22,000 (1968). 

In April 2017 the independent Russian newspaper Novaya Gazeta documented that Chechen authorities had set up so-called "gay concentration camps", within the town.

Administrative and municipal status
Within the framework of administrative divisions, it is incorporated as the town of republic significance of Argun—an administrative unit with the status equal to that of the districts.<ref name="Ref162">Constitution of the Chechen Republic</ref> As a municipal division, the town of republic significance of Argun is incorporated as Argun Urban Okrug.

Climate
Argun has a humid continental climate (Köppen climate classification: Dfa'').

References

Notes

Sources

External links
Official website of Argun 
Directory of organizations in Argun 

Cities and towns in Chechnya